Zachary Tognon Fernandez (born 24 September 2001) is a Canadian professional soccer player who plays as a right-back for HFX Wanderers of the Canadian Premier League.

Early life
In his youth, Fernandez played with the CF Montréal Academy. He attended training camp with the CF Montréal first team in 2020 and 2021.

Club career
In 2021, Fernandez joined Première ligue de soccer du Québec side AS Blainville and played in their 2021 Canadian Championship match against Canadian Premier League club HFX Wanderers FC.

In January 2022, Fernandez signed his first professional contract with Canadian Premier League side HFX Wanderers FC. He made his debut in HFX's season opener on April 7 against York United. In his rookie season, he led the team in assists. In December 2022, he signed an extension with the Wanderers, guaranteeing his contract through 2024.

International career
Fernandez made his debut in the Canadian youth program at a Canada U14 identification camp in December 2015.

Career statistics

References

External links

2001 births
Living people
Association football defenders
Canadian soccer players
Soccer people from Quebec
People from Blainville, Quebec
A.S. Blainville players
HFX Wanderers FC players
Première ligue de soccer du Québec players
Canadian Premier League players